Ned LeDoux is an American country music singer and songwriter. He has released two studio albums. He also has his own live show on Instagram with Big Das Lawrence.

History
Ned LeDoux was born in Kaycee, Wyoming, also the hometown of his father, country music singer Chris LeDoux. The younger LeDoux began playing drums in his father's road band, Western Underground, in 1998. LeDoux began recording solo material in 2015, working with producer Mac McAnally. His debut EP Forever a Cowboy came out in 2016. LeDoux wrote four of the five songs on it. Sagebrush, his first full-length album, followed in 2017. On November 8, 2019, LeDoux released his 2nd studio album Next in Line.

LeDoux also appears on Chase Rice's 2017 album Lambs & Lions, as a duet partner on a rendition of Chris LeDoux's "This Cowboy's Hat".

Personal life
LeDoux is the son of singer-songwriter and rodeo champion Chris LeDoux.

LeDoux is married to his wife Morgan. Their two-year-old daughter died of accidental choking in October 2019.

Discography

Studio albums

Singles

Other appearances

References

American country drummers
American country singer-songwriters
Living people
Country musicians from Wyoming
1977 births
Country musicians from Tennessee
People from Kaycee, Wyoming
21st-century American singers
21st-century American drummers
Singer-songwriters from Wyoming
Singer-songwriters from Tennessee